Seventeen is a 1983 American documentary film directed by Joel DeMott and Jeff Kreines. It is a film about coming of age in working class America.

It was awarded the Grand Jury Prize Documentary at the 1985 Sundance Film Festival.

Critical reception 
Vincent Canby of The New York Times called Seventeen, "one of the best and most scarifying reports on American life to be seen on a theater screen." In a later piece he added "It's Seventeen that haunts the memory. It has the characters and the language — as well as the vitality and honesty — that are the material of the best fiction. Ferociously provocative."

Michael Sragow, writing in The New Yorker, said: "Working with lightweight camera rigs they developed themselves, Jeff Kreines and Joel DeMott (who, despite the name, is female) approach the subjects of their documentary – working-class teenagers in Muncie, Indiana – man-to-man and woman-to-woman. The immediacy is refreshing, and shocking. As searing as it is rambunctious, this film brings out all the middle-class prejudices against the working class that American movies rarely confront."

Johnny Ray Huston, writing in SF360 and Indiewire, said "One thing is for sure: Seventeen is without a doubt one of the greatest movies, perhaps the greatest, about teenage life (not to mention American life) ever made."

Ira Glass, host of This American Life, said it was "the most amazing reporting on a high school that I had ever seen. It's called 'Seventeen' and it was directed by a couple, a woman named Joel DeMott and a man named Jeff Kreines. It was made in 1983, filmed at Southside High School in Muncie, Indiana. It's just this incredible document. It's so real and just one amazing moment after another."

Accolades
Seventeen was awarded the Grand Jury Prize Documentary at the 1985 Sundance Film Festival, where the jurors were Barbara Kopple, D. A. Pennebaker, and Frederick Wiseman.

See also
Working class culture
Coming of age
1985 in film

References

External links 
 The filmmakers' Notes on Seventeen
 About Seventeen
 Johnny Ray Huston review of Seventeen
  Film Comment article about Seventeen
 
 SUNDANCE FILM FESTIVAL. FILMS HONORED 1985–2008, page 17.
  Link to see the uncensored version of Seventeen free 
 Trailer

Sundance Film Festival award winners
Documentary films about adolescence
Films about the working class
1983 documentary films
1983 films
American documentary films
1980s English-language films
1980s American films